Walter Neville Howell (born 17 December 1929) is an Australian Olympic medal winning rower. He was born in the state of Victoria and his senior rowing from 1951 was with the Banks Rowing Club in Melbourne. In 1956 he was in the six seat of the Australian boat that won the bronze medal in the eights event of the 1956 Summer Olympics. Four years later in Tokyo he was eliminated with the Australian boat in the repechage of the men's coxed pair event. In 1962 he won a gold medal in the men's VIIIs event at the Perth Commonwealth Games. In 2010 was inducted as a member of the Rowing Victoria Hall of Fame.

References
 profile

1929 births
Living people
Australian male rowers
Olympic rowers of Australia
Rowers at the 1956 Summer Olympics
Rowers at the 1960 Summer Olympics
Olympic bronze medalists for Australia
Olympic medalists in rowing
Medalists at the 1956 Summer Olympics
Commonwealth Games medallists in rowing
Commonwealth Games gold medallists for Australia
Rowers at the 1962 British Empire and Commonwealth Games
Medallists at the 1962 British Empire and Commonwealth Games